General elections were held in Brazil on 1 March 1894 to elect both president and both houses of Congress. The presidential election was won by Prudente de Morais of the Paulista Republican Party, who received 80.1% of the vote.

Results

President

References

General elections in Brazil
Brazil
1894 in Brazil
Brazil
Election and referendum articles with incomplete results
Elections of the First Brazilian Republic